Tomorrow and tomorrow and tomorrow is a famous quotation from Shakespeare's play Macbeth.

Tomorrow and tomorrow and tomorrow may also refer to:

 "Tomorrow and Tomorrow and Tomorrow" (short story), a 1953 story by Kurt Vonnegut
 Tomorrow, and Tomorrow, and Tomorrow..., 1974 anthology reprinting the 1957 short story "Omnilingual" by H. Beam Piper
 Tomorrow and Tomorrow and Tomorrow, U.S. title for Aldous Huxley's 1956 essay collection Adonis and the Alphabet
 Tomorrow and Tomorrow and Tomorrow, 1947 Australian novel by M. Barnard Eldershaw
 "Tomorrow, and Tomorrow, and Tomorrow", season 2 episode of The Orville
 Tomorrow, and Tomorrow, and Tomorrow, a 2022 novel by Gabrielle Zevin

See also
 Tomorrow and Tomorrow & The Fairy Chessmen, a 1951 collection of two novels by Lewis Padgett
 Tomorrow and Tomorrow (disambiguation)
 Tomorrow (disambiguation)